Turbo Angels are a Slovenian turbo-folk quartet. Menart Records published their premier single, Naj se dviga, in 2005, and their debut album, Mi smo za…, in June 2006.

Dejan Bojanec replaced Dejan Gorenjec Raj as the band's diatonic accordion player in 2006, shortly before the release of Mi smo za…, which they had already recorded with Raj. Raj (age 24 at the time of his announcement) left Turbo Angels in March 2006, citing medical problems.

Turbo Angels' performance of their song "Zabava" ranked sixth in the finals for the 2008 EMA, Slovenia's national competition for Eurovision Song Contest 2008.

See also

References

External links 
 
 Turbo Angels on Myspace

Slovenian musical groups
Pop-folk music groups